Caldwell Hall, on the Cornell University campus, was added to the National Register of Historic Places in 1984. It was named after George Chapman Caldwell (1834–1907), the first head of the chemistry department at Cornell.

References

Cornell University buildings
University and college buildings on the National Register of Historic Places in New York (state)
National Register of Historic Places in Tompkins County, New York
1914 establishments in New York (state)
Green & Wicks buildings